Nothing Lasts Forever is a 1979 action thriller novel by American author Roderick Thorp, a sequel to his 1966 novel The Detective. The novel is mostly known through its 1988 film adaptation Die Hard, starring Bruce Willis. In 2012, the book was brought back into print and released as an ebook for the 24th anniversary of the film.

Plot
Retired NYPD detective Joe Leland is visiting the 40-story office headquarters of the Klaxon Oil Corporation in Los Angeles on Christmas Eve, where his daughter Stephanie Leland Gennaro works. 

While he is waiting for his daughter's Christmas party to end, a group of German Autumn–era terrorists take over the skyscraper. The gang is led by the brutal Anton "Little Tony the Red" Gruber. Joe had known about Gruber through a counter-terrorist conference he had attended years prior. Barefoot, Leland slips away and manages to remain undetected in the gigantic office complex. Armed with only his Browning Pistol and in communication with Los Angeles Police sergeant Al Powell and his belligerent supervisor, Dwayne Robinson, Leland fights off the terrorists one by one in an attempt to save the 74 hostages, his daughter and grandchildren.

After executing the CEO of the Klaxon building, Mr. Rivers, Gruber and the terrorists proceed to steal documents that will publicly expose the Klaxon corporation's dealings with Chile's junta. They also intend to deprive Klaxon of the proceeds of the corrupt deal of $6,000,000 in cash by attempting to access a safe. Leland interferes with this plan by stealing explosives and progressively killing terrorists and receiving multiple injuries in the process.

Leland kills most of the terrorists and, despite no help from the police, faces off with the leader of the terrorist group, Anton Gruber, who is holding his daughter hostage. Gruber falls to his death after being shot by Leland, taking Stephanie with him. Blaming Klaxon for the terrorist attack and his daughter's death, Leland throws the cash out of the window himself. Once Leland is back on the street, the last terrorist, Karl, who was presumed dead earlier, returns and starts a shooting rampage, killing police (including Robinson) and a doctor in the process, before Sgt Powell finally kills him, allowing Leland to receive medical care.

Characters

 Joseph Leland - an aging, retired New York Police detective on his way to Los Angeles to visit his daughter for a Christmas party hosted by her boss, Mr. Rivers. Although retired, he still habitually carries his Browning Hi-Power pistol with him everywhere. On the plane, Leland begins a relationship with a stewardess named Kathi, who he talks to throughout the novel over the phone. Leland is still somewhat depressed that his wife had left him and then died eight years later, and the relationship between him and his daughter is strained.
 Stephanie Gennaro - the only daughter of Joseph Leland and an important executive to the Klaxon Oil building. She is sleeping with another executive named Harry Ellis. She invited her father to the party in the hope of seeing him and wishing him a Merry Christmas, but she soon falls hostage to Anton "Little Tony" Gruber. 
 Anton "Little Tony The Red" Gruber - is the ruthless leader of the terrorists who have taken over the Klaxon Oil Building, and one of the few who can speak English. Gruber is his real name but people (including Leland) often refer to him as "Little Tony" or "Tony" as a nickname. 
 Al Powell - a 22-year-old Los Angeles Police sergeant who is sent to the Klaxon Oil headquarters to check on an emergency call made by Leland and is soon thrown into radio contact with him and monitored by Gruber. Powell tries to talk Leland into keeping calm and not to lose his cool and sees Leland as the true hero that he is. 
 Dwayne Robinson - the deputy chief of police and is sent in to take charge of the situation at hand. He automatically dislikes Leland for what he is doing and feels that he is only making things worse for the hostages. He tries to convince himself that Leland could be one of the terrorists or a lunatic but is soon on Leland's side when he finds out what Leland's been doing. 
 Karl - Anton's right-hand man. Near the beginning of the novel, Leland kills his younger brother, Hans, and throughout the remainder of the novel, Karl wants nothing but Leland's blood. 
 Mr. Rivers - the president of Klaxon Oil, he hosts the Christmas party and arranged the ride in for Leland. Rivers is soon disliked by Leland and is taken hostage by Gruber to get the safe code in order to get the millions of dollars in the safe. Rivers refuses to give the code and Gruber shoots him in the lapel, killing him. 
 Harry Ellis - a sleazy executive in the Klaxon Oil Building who is sleeping with Stephanie Leland Gennaro and does drugs such as cocaine, which makes Leland dislike him. In the middle of the novel, Ellis tries to help the terrorists and himself by trying to talk Leland into giving himself up. When Leland refuses Ellis's proposal, Gruber kills Ellis, which makes Leland feel responsible for his death.

Background and film adaptation

In 1975, author Roderick Thorp saw the film The Towering Inferno, which is about a skyscraper that catches on fire. After seeing the film, Thorp fell asleep and had a dream of seeing a man being chased through a skyscraper by men with guns. He woke up and later took that idea and turned it into The Detective sequel, Nothing Lasts Forever.

Roderick Thorp decided for the book to be a sequel to The Detective so it could be made into a follow-up film starring Frank Sinatra as Joe Leland. Thus, the storyline hypothetically takes place some four decades after its predecessor (as Leland was age thirty-six in that novel). Sinatra declined the offer. It was then offered to Arnold Schwarzenegger, Sylvester Stallone and a number of other actors until Bruce Willis signed on for the role.

Although the film (re-titled Die Hard) was altered to be a stand-alone film with no connections to Thorp's novel, and does not follow the source material very closely, some of its memorable scenes, characters, and dialogue are adapted directly from the book. Some of the biggest changes in the film included the older hero of the novel becoming 25 years younger, his name changed from "Joe Leland" to "John McClane", the person he is in the skyscraper to visit changing from his daughter to his estranged wife, and the American "Klaxon Oil Corporation" becoming the Japanese "Nakatomi Corporation". The "terrorists" in the film are actually professional thieves that are after $640 million in negotiable bearer bonds kept in the building's vault and are only posing as terrorists to draw attention away from the robbery. In the film, most of them are German (including their leader), the rest being of varying ethnicities and nationalities. The novel also features women amongst the terrorists. The overall tone of the novel was far darker, with underlying themes of guilt, alcoholism and the complexity of a disturbed human mind. The ending of the novel is also different in that it suggests that the wounds Joe sustained were so severe that he could possibly succumb to them and die.

Similarly, Willis explained in a 1988 interview with KXAS-TV's entertainment reporter Bobbie Wygant that he acted out McClane with enough fear, anxiety, and vulnerability to make audiences believe that he could indeed possibly be killed because of what happened in the story, as Joseph Leland could possibly have died of his injuries in the book.

Some of the most famous action sequences taken from the book are:

 Leland/McClane crawling through HVAC ducts.
 Leland/McClane dropping a C-4 bomb down an elevator shaft.
 Leland/McClane jumping off an exploding roof with a fire hose attached to his waist and then shooting through a window to gain re-entry.
 Leland/McClane taping his gun to his back at the climax.

Reception

The Los Angeles Times called Nothing Lasts Forever "a ferocious, bloody, raging book so single-mindedly brilliant in concept and execution it should be read at a single sitting".

References

Sources

1979 American novels
American novels adapted into films
American thriller novels
Die Hard
Novels set in Los Angeles
W. W. Norton & Company books
Christmas books